Roni Tri Prasnanto is an Indonesian footballer who plays as a goalkeeper for Persela Lamongan.

References

External links

Living people
1985 births
Indonesian footballers
People from Banyuwangi Regency
Persekabpas Pasuruan players
Persiba Bantul players
Persitara Jakarta Utara players
Persija Jakarta players
Persela Lamongan players
Persebaya Surabaya players
Liga 1 (Indonesia) players
Association football goalkeepers
Sportspeople from East Java